Justin Erik Halldór Smith (aka Justin E. H. Smith) (born July 30, 1972, in Reno, Nevada) is an American-Canadian professor of history and philosophy of science at the University of Paris 7 - Denis Diderot. His primary research interests include Leibniz, Post-structuralism, early modern philosophy, history and philosophy of biology, classical Indian philosophy, the history and philosophy of anthropology.

Smith is the author of several books and is also a sometime contributor to The New York Times, Harper's Magazine, n+1, Slate, and Art in America. 

Smith is an editor-at-large of Cabinet Magazine. 

Since the fall of 2020, he has been publishing philosophical and critical essays on his Substack newsletter: Justin E.H. Smith's Hinternet.The main-belt asteroid 13585 Justinsmith is named after Smith.

Background and education 
 2019-20  John and Constance Birkelund Fellow, Cullman Center for Scholars and Writers, New York Public Library
 2016-17  Émile Francqui Chair, Université Libre de Bruxelles, Belgium. 
 2011  Visiting scholar in the School of Historical Studies at the Institute for Advanced Study, Princeton
 2007-08  Humboldt Foundation Research Fellow, Institut für Philosophie, Humboldt University of Berlin
 2000  PhD in philosophy from Columbia University
 1997-98  Doctoral Research on a DAAD Fellowship University of Münster
 1994  BA with honors in philosophy and Russian at University of California, Davis

BibliographyThe Internet Is Not What You Think It Is: A History, a Philosophy, a Warning, Princeton University Press (March 22, 2022) Irrationality: A History of the Dark Side of Reason, Princeton University Press (April, 2019) 
 The Philosopher: A History in Six Types, Princeton University Press (May 7, 2016) 
 Nature, Human Nature, and Human Difference: Race in Early Modern Philosophy, Princeton University Press (June 30, 2015) 
 Divine Machines: Leibniz and the Sciences of Life, Princeton University Press (May 1, 2011) 
 The Life Sciences in Early Modern Philosophy (ed., with Ohad Nachtomy), Oxford University Press (January 6, 2014) 
 The Problem of Animal Generation in Early Modern Philosophy'' (ed.), Cambridge University Press (May 22, 2006)

References

External links
 

1972 births
21st-century American philosophers
21st-century Canadian philosophers
American emigrants to Canada
American male non-fiction writers
American people of Scandinavian descent
American science writers
Canadian male non-fiction writers
Canadian people of Scandinavian descent
Canadian science writers
Columbia University alumni
Academic staff of Concordia University
Gottfried Wilhelm Leibniz scholars
Living people
Miami University faculty
Philosophers from Nevada
Philosophers of science
University of California, Davis alumni
Academic staff of the University of Paris
Writers from Reno, Nevada